A by-election was held for the New South Wales Legislative Assembly electorate of The Williams on 19 April 1866 because the seat of Frederick Manton was declared vacant due to insolvency.

Dates

Result

The seat of Frederick Manton was declared vacant due to insolvency.

See also
 Electoral results for the district of Williams (New South Wales)
 List of New South Wales state by-elections

References

1866 elections in Australia
New South Wales state by-elections
1860s in New South Wales